Red apple may refer to:

Apples
A red apple
List of apple cultivars
Red Delicious

Businesses
Red Apple, formerly The Bargain! Shop, a Canadian discount store chain
Red Apple Group, an American real estate and aviation company 
Red Apple convenience stores owned by United Refining Company
 Red Apple, trademark of the Waldorf System lunchroom chain in New England

Culture
The Red Apple, in Turkish mythology - especially Oghuz Turk - is an ideal or dream which the more one thinks about the more distant but also the more attractive it becomes.

Places
Red Apple, Alabama, U.S.

Other
The Red Apple, a skyscraper in Rotterdam, Netherlands
The Red Apple (film), a 1975 Soviet drama film
Red Apples (film), a 1975 Romanian drama film
Acmena ingens, or red apple, a rainforest tree of eastern Australia
Red Apple, a fictional brand of cigarette in Quentin Tarantino films

See also